The Roman Road in Cambridgeshire, also known as Worsted Street Roman Road, is a  linear biological Site of Special Scientific Interest stretching from south-east of Cambridge to north of Linton. It is also a Scheduled Monument, and is maintained by Cambridgeshire County Council.

This green lane has calcareous grassland, thick hedges and small copses, which provide a valuable habitat for invertebrates. There are grasses such as sheep’s-fescue and quaking-grass, while herbs include wild carrot and purple milk-vetch.

The date of the road is uncertain, but archaeological excavation has confirmed that it is Roman, and probably constructed later than the first century. It was a local road connecting Cambridge to the Icknield Way.

The road is a public footpath and part of the E2 European long distance path.

References

Sites of Special Scientific Interest in Cambridgeshire
Scheduled monuments in Cambridgeshire
Roman roads in England
Long-distance footpaths in England